The Armenia women's national under-18 basketball team is a national basketball team of Armenia, administered by the Basketball Federation of Armenia. It represents the country in women's international under-18 basketball competitions.

The team won five medals at the FIBA U18 Women's European Championship Division C.

See also
Armenia women's national basketball team
Armenia women's national under-16 basketball team
Armenia men's national under-18 basketball team

References

External links
Archived records of Armenia team participations

Armenia national basketball team
Women's national under-18 basketball teams
Basketball